Federico di Sanseverino (died 1516) was an Italian Roman Catholic cardinal of the 16th century.

Biography

Federico di Sanseverino was born in Naples in 1475 or 1477. He was the son of Roberto Sanseverino d'Aragona, a general of the papal army, and his second wife Elisabetta da Montefeltro. 

Early in his career, he was a cleric in Milan before becoming a protonotary apostolic. On 5 November 1481 he became the apostolic administrator of the see of Maillezais and occupied that post until 1508. Around 1492, he became provost of the church of Santa Maria in Crescenzago. He was the apostolic administrator of the see of Novara from 30 May 1505 until 24 October 1511.

In the consistory of 9 March 1489, Pope Innocent VIII made him a cardinal deacon in pectore. Because of his youth, his creation was not published during the lifetime of Innocent VIII. During the sede vacante following the death of Innocent VIII, Cardinal Ascanio Sforza convinced the College of Cardinals to publish Sanseverino's creation on 26 July 1492, and he received the deaconry of San Teodoro. He was therefore able to participate in the papal conclave of 1492 that elected Pope Alexander VI.

In November 1494, the new pope sent Cardinal Sanseverino as papal legate to Charles VIII of France in Siena. He returned quickly to Rome, where his loyalty was suspected by the pope. In order to frighten the rebels of Ostia, Cardinal Sanseverino and Cardinal Bernardino Lunati were arrested following the consistory of 10 December 1494, and held in the Apostolic Palace until 19 December 1494. He was then sent again as legate to Charles VIII; he subsequently accompanied the French king on his entrance to Rome on 31 December 1494. He traveled with the pope to Orvieto on 27 May 1495 and returned to Rome with the pontiff on 27 June.

On 8 February 1496 he became apostolic administrator of the see of Thérouanne, occupying this post until 12 November 1498. On 1 July 1497 he became apostolic administrator of the see of Vienne and held this office until 26 January 1515. On 3 August 1499 he left, with the pope's permission, for Milan to join Cardinal Ascanio Sforza.

He participated in the papal conclave of September 1503 that elected Pope Pius III. He also participated in the papal conclave of October 1503 that elected Pope Julius II.

On 24 May 1504 Pope Julius II named him papal legate to the Patrimonium Sancti Petri. He became apostolic administrator of the see of Novara on 30 May 1505. On 1 May 1510 he opted for the deaconry of Sant'Angelo in Pescheria, while continuing to hold the deaconry of San Teodoro in commendam.

After the pope threatened to imprison Cardinal Sanseverino in the Castel Sant'Angelo in June 1510, the cardinal joined the pope's enemies. In October 1510, he sought refuge, with another four cardinals, in the camp of the French army and went to Milan. There, on 16 May 1511, he was one of the signatories of a document calling a council in Pisa for 1 September 1511. He did not attend this council after the pope threatened him with excommunication. He was present with the French forces at the Battle of Ravenna (1512); Louis XII of France planned to make Cardinal Sanseverino governor of the Papal States after deposing the pope, but this never came to pass.

Following the death of Pope Julius II, Cardinal Sanseverino did not participate in the papal conclave of 1513 that elected Pope Leo X. Shortly thereafter the cardinal was arrested in Florence on the pope's orders, with a promise he would be released if he repented. On 17 June 1513 he denounced the schismatical council of Pisa and submitted to the pope's authority in a letter later read at a session of the Fifth Council of the Lateran. He and Cardinal Bernardino López de Carvajal arrived in Rome on 27 June 1513 and personally repented in a secret consistory held in Rome. He was absolved by the pope, ordered to fast for a month, and restored to the College of Cardinals.

From June 1513, he was the cardinal protodeacon. Shortly later, he was named cardinal protector of the Kingdom of France. On 25 June 1515 he was arrested on the pope's orders because it looked like one of his servants had killed a papal guard, but he proved his innocence the next day. In November 1515, he was sent as a papal legate to Francis I of France, who met him outside the gates of Bologna.

He died in Rome on 7 August 1516. He is buried in Santa Maria in Aracoeli.

References

15th-century births
1516 deaths
16th-century Italian cardinals
Federico
People temporarily excommunicated by the Catholic Church
15th-century Italian cardinals